The Wings of Change Chinhook Bi is an Austrian two-place paraglider that was designed by Markus Gründhammer and produced by Wings of Change of Fulpmes. It is now out of production.

Design and development
The aircraft was designed as a tandem glider for flight training and as such was referred to as the Chinhook Bi, indicating "bi-place" or two seater.

The glider is DHV 1-2 and EN/LTF A certified.

Specifications (Chinhook Bi)

References

External links

Chinhook
Paragliders